The Chesley Award for Lifetime Artistic Achievement is given by the Association of Science Fiction and Fantasy Artists (ASFA) to recognize the achievements of a science fiction or fantasy artist for work over their entire careers.

Winners and nominees

References

External links
 The Chesley Award section of the ASFA website

Lifetime Artistic Achievement
Science fiction awards